Epimetheus was a Titan in Greek mythology.

Epimetheus may also refer to:

Epimetheus (moon), a moon of Saturn
1810 Epimetheus, an asteroid

See also
 Epimitheus, a ballet by Russell Ducker premiered by the Barcelona Ballet